The title Aboriginal affairs minister or Minister for Aboriginal Affairs is the current or former title of a position in several governments, including:

Australia
 Minister for Indigenous Affairs (Australia), a federal government minister, from 2019 known as the Minister for Indigenous Australians
 Minister for Aboriginal Affairs (Northern Territory)
 Minister for Aboriginal Affairs (South Australia)
 Minister for Aboriginal Affairs (New South Wales)
 Minister for Aboriginal Affairs (Victoria)
 Minister for Aboriginal Affairs (Western Australia)

Canada
 Minister of Indigenous and Northern Affairs (Canada)